GBA-11 (Kharmang-I) is a constituency of Gilgit Baltistan Assembly which is currently represented by Syed Amjad Ali Zaidi of PTI.

Members

Election results

2009
Syed Muhammad Ali Shah Rizvi of PPP became member of assembly by getting 3,145 votes.

2015
Iqbal Hassan of PML-N won this seat by getting 5,165 votes.

References

Gilgit-Baltistan Legislative Assembly constituencies